Borivoje "Borko" Jovanović was a Serbian basketball player. He represented the Yugoslavia national basketball team internationally.

Playing career 
Jovanović played for a Belgrade-based team Crvena zvezda of the Yugoslav First League during 1950s. His teammates were Milan Bjegojević, Ladislav Demšar, Borislav Ćurčić, Dragan Godžić, Aleksandar Gec, Đorđe Andrijašević and many others. He won seven Yugoslav Championships with the Zvezda. Over nine seasons with the Zvezda he played 127 games.

In July 1950, he was a member of the Zvezda squad that won an international cup tournament in Milan, Italy.

National team career 
Jovanović was a member of the Yugoslavia national basketball team that placed th at the 1953 European Championship in Moscow, the Soviet Union. Over two tournament games, he averaged 3.0 points per game.

Personal life 
Jovanović had one brother, Slavoljub "Slava", who was a basketball player, also. Slava played for BSK from 1951 to 1953.

Career achievements and awards 
 Yugoslav League champion: 7 (with Crvena zvezda: 1949, 1950, 1951, 1952, 1953, 1954, 1955).

See also 
 List of KK Crvena zvezda players with 100 games played
 Jovanović (family name)

References

KK Crvena zvezda players
Serbian men's basketball players
Yugoslav men's basketball players
Year of birth missing
Year of death missing
Place of birth missing
Place of death missing